The National Academy of Motion Pictures Arts and Sciences of Russia is the official film academy of Russia. Every year it awards the Golden Eagle Award.

References

Organizations established in 2002
Golden Eagle Awards (Russia)
2002 establishments in Russia